The Pazmany PL-1 Laminar and Pazmany PL-2 are American two-seat trainer and personal light aircraft designed by Ladislao Pazmany to be marketed as a homebuilt aircraft by his company Pazmany Aircraft Corporation. The aircraft was built under license in Taiwan (Republic of China) as the AIDC PL-1B Cheinshou. It was later followed by an improved version the PL-2. The SLAF Aircraft Engineering Wing developed a modified variant of the PL-2 in 1977, which never saw combat but was used in air shows.

Development
The PL-1 Laminar was the first design by Ladislao Pazmany, it was intended to be marketed for the homebuilt market. The prototype first flew on the 23 March 1962. The PL-1 is a cantilever low-wing monoplane with a fixed tricycle landing gear. It has side-by-side seating for a crew of two and is powered by a 95 hp (71 kW) Continental C-90 piston engine. The Aerospace Industrial Development Corporation (AIDC) acquired plans and built a PL-1 for evaluation with a first flight on 26 October 1968. AIDC then built 58 aircraft designated the PL-1B for the Republic of China Air Force and fitted with a 150 hp (112 kW) Avco Lycoming O-320 engine.

Soon after the first flight Pazmany produced an improved design, the PL-2 which had a slight increase in cockpit width and changes to the structure to make it easier for homebuilders. The PL-2 was evaluated by a number of air forces in South East Asia. It was built under license in Indonesia as the LIPNUR LT-200.

Variants

PL-1
Original design for home-built light aircraft
PL-1B
License-built variant by AIDC with a 150hp (112kW) Avco Lycoming O-320 engine, 58 built. Known as the PL-1B Chieh Shou.
PL-2
More rounded, wider cockpit, increased wing dihedral.
PL-2A
Improved model, all metal, two seats
LT-200
License-built variant by LIPNUR in Indonesia, 4 were built.

Operators

Indonesian Air Force - LT-200 (Licensed-built PL-2)

Republic of Vietnam Air Force - One aircraft, no longer in service. Named Tien Phong "Pioneer" and built under U.S supervision. Plans for additional aircraft were cancelled in 1972

 Republic of China Air Force - PL-1, PL-1A, PL-1B
 Republic of China Army - PL-1B

Former Operators

Sri Lanka Air Force - Sri Lankan built PL-2 variants were in operation until the early 1980s.

Specifications (LT-200)

References

 The Illustrated Encyclopedia of Aircraft (Part Work 1982-1985), 1985, Orbis Publishing, Page 2694

1960s United States civil utility aircraft
PL-01
AIDC aircraft
1960s United States military trainer aircraft
Single-engined tractor aircraft
Low-wing aircraft
Aircraft first flown in 1962